Mad Dogs is an American comedy thriller television series produced by Amazon Prime Video. It is a partial remake of the British show, also named Mad Dogs, that aired from 2011 to 2013.

Background 
The show's first season consisted of 10 episodes, expanding on the British version's first season's four hours of content. It began airing on January 22, 2016 in the U.S., U.K., and Germany, with an early release of the show available in December 2015.

Premise 
The plot is a "cocktail of testosterone and bad decision-making", focused on the angst of a group of 40-something underachieving American men who become caught in a "vacation from hell".

Casting 
The actors have mostly episodic TV credits, including Billy Zane as a man wealthy from underworld connections who invites his friends for a stay in Belize, Michael Imperioli as an irresponsible but good-hearted former traveling musician, Romany Malco as a family man, and Ben Chaplin (who starred in the Zane role in the UK version of the show) as an embittered teacher. The show's female cast, including Allison Tolman and María Botto (reprising her role from the UK series), provide contrast to the male leads.

Cast

Main cast 
Ben Chaplin as Joel
Michael Imperioli as Lex
Romany Malco as Gus
Steve Zahn as Cobi
Phil Davis as Lawrence, a local crime boss

Recurring cast 
Mark Povinelli as The Cat, a hitman
Rachael Holmes as Erica, a local pharmacy worker
Maria Botto as Sophia Moreno, a local police woman
Coby Bell as Aaron, a CIA agent
Allison Tolman as Rochelle, an employee at the Embassy of the United States in Belize
Billy Zane as Milo
Ted Levine as Conrad Tull, an FBI agent
Sutton Foster as Gerda.

Production 
Showrunner Cris Cole adapted the show from his own drama in the UK. It was originally under development at the FX network. Cole noted that because the American version is 10 hours to the British version's first season's four hours, the last six hours of the American version are "virgin territory" and have no comparative to the original.

Rights to air the show were sold by Sony Pictures Television for more than 140 countries prior to the initial Amazon airing.

In late-February 2016, Amazon announced that it had opted not to renew the series. Although the original intention had been for the show to be a 10 episode limited series, Amazon and the show leadership had broached the idea of a potential second season.

During filming of scenes of the pilot episode in Puerto Rico, actor Steve Zahn contracted dengue fever.

Reception
The show earned mostly positive reviews and anecdotal evidence pointed to solid early viewership. Critics have praised the cinematography of Belize in the "blue sky" show as "gorgeous." The first season holds a rating of 64 out of a 100 on metacritic.

Critics note that the show wanders during its formulaic middle episodes of the season but is best as interpersonal conflicts are the focus. Amazon opted not to renew the series for a second season.

Episodes

References

External links 
 
 

2010s American drama television series
2015 American television series debuts
2016 American television series endings
Amazon Prime Video original programming
American television series based on British television series
Television series by Amazon Studios
Television series by Left Bank Pictures
Television series by Sony Pictures Television
Television shows set in Puerto Rico